Gray Mountain is a unincorporated community in Coconino County, Arizona, United States. It is assigned the ZIP code 86016.

The small community contained some motels, a trading post store, gas stations, and an Arizona Department of Transportation maintenance yard.Laurence, Robert P. Canyon Offers Bike Tour Drenched in Beauty, Marion Star ("A hardy rider could skip Cameron, continuing eight miles to Gray Mountain, up a long hill to the site of a more luxurious motel and a choice of two or three restaurants.  And, because it is off the reservation, Gray Mountain has liquor available.")  The Gray Mountain Trading Post was first opened in 1935, and weathered a major fire in 1981.Eddington, Patrick. Trading Post Guidebook, p. 64 (1995) The Gray Mountain Motel burned down in 1989; Gray Mountain had no fire department, and the limited response from nearby fire departments raised concerns about rural firefighting in Arizona. Most of these facilities have since closed.  The Whitling Brothers Motel which was abandoned in 2005 is now used by the Painted Desert Project, which decorates abandoned buildings in the area.(October 2022).  Forgotten but not gone, Arizona Daily Sun A small gas station still operated at Gray Mountain as of 2018.

There have been proposals to place a wind farm on the Gray Mountain ridge laying immediately west of the community.(28 March 2008). Rez ready to develop wind power, Arizona Daily Sun, p. 1 ("Gray Mountain southwest of Cameron is being evaluated for a possible wind farm." "the Gray Mountain ridge southwest of Tuba City and Cameron, immediate west of Gray Mountain") The area is home to a large population of wild horses, though they have struggled due to drought conditions.

Climate
According to the Köppen Climate Classification system, Gray Mountain has a semi-arid climate, abbreviated "BSk" on climate maps.

References

Unincorporated communities in Coconino County, Arizona
Unincorporated communities in Arizona